is a quarter (Stadtteil) of Hamburg, Germany within the borough (Bezirk) of Hamburg-Mitte. It is situated on the eponymous island between the Northern and Southern branches of the Elbe river (Norderelbe and Süderelbe), together with the other quarters of Steinwerder, Veddel and Wilhelmsburg. It almost exclusively consists of facilities of the port of Hamburg. The four quarters are technically all islands of their own, as they are all separated by their own dams. In 2020 the population was 1,120.

History
It is believed that the privateer Klaus Störtebeker was beheaded on the Grasbrook island in 1400 or 1401.

During World War II the port of Hamburg and therefore Kleiner Grasbrook were targets of the air raids of the so-called Operation Gomorrah. From mid-July 1944 until October 1945 the subcamp Dessauer Ufer to the Neuengamme concentration camp existed in the quarter.

On the night of 16 to 17 February 1962 the island was widely flooded and seriously damaged by a north sea flood.

Geography
Kleiner Grasbrook borders in the north to the HafenCity quarter. In the east is the Veddel quarter and in the west the Steinwerder quarter. In the south is the Wilhelmsburg quarter.

Demographics
In 2006 Kleiner Grasbrook had 1,219 inhabitants. In 1999 there were 694 households, out of which 21.3% had children under the age of 18 living with them, and 47.7% of all households were made up of individuals. The average household size was 1.95.

Population by year

In 2006 there were 334 criminal offences (274 crimes per 1,000 people).

Politics
These are the results of the Hamburg state election:

Economy

Parts of the port of Hamburg are located in the Kleiner Grasbrook quarter.

Infrastructure
There were no schools in the quarter and no physicians in private practice and no pharmacies.

Transportation
According to the Department of Motor Vehicles (Kraftfahrt-Bundesamt), in the quarter were 113 private cars registered (93 cars/1,000 people).

Notes

References

 Statistical office Hamburg and Schleswig-Holstein Statistisches Amt für Hamburg und Schleswig-Holstein, official website

External links

 Homepage of the unincorporated association Kleiner Grasbrook e.V.. 

Quarters of Hamburg
Hamburg-Mitte